Ashin Vāyamānanda, commonly known as Shwesannwe Sayadaw, is a Burmese Theravada Buddhist monk. Sayadaw was a religious representative in the Buddhist cooperation between Myanmar and China. In 2013, he built the charitable Shwesannwe clinics in Sintai to offer free primary medical health care for the poor. He later expanded into an eye hospital in 2018.

Early life and education
The future sayadaw was born on 1973 in Sintai Village, Yinmabin Township, Saging Region, to parents U Kyaw and Daw Nyo.

He completed B.A (Buddhism), M.A (Buddhism) and Ph.D (Magadh University).

Publications
 အန္တိမဝန္ဒာနာ မြတ်ဆရာ
 အလှဘယ်လိုပြင်ကြမယ်
 အပ်ပျောက်လျှင်ဆင်နဲ့ရှာ
 ပြန်ချိန်တန်လျှင်ပြန်ပါ
 စွမ်းအားကြီးမားကုသိုလ်တရား
 ဘုရားကိုဘယ်လိုဖူးမျှော်ရမလဲ
 နေရာ
 အိမ်ကလေးထဲမှာပျော်မွေ့ပါ
 မနိုးသောအိပ်ခြင်းဖြစ်မှာစိုးတယ်

References 

1973 births
Living people
People from Sagaing Region
Burmese Buddhist monks
Theravada Buddhist monks